The following is a summary of Down county football team's 2022 season, which was its 119th year. On 24 November 2021, James McCartan Jnr was reappointed Down manager, following a stint in the job between 2009 and 2014.

Competitions

Dr McKenna Cup

The McKenna Cup returned for the first time since 2019 following a cancelation in 2020 due to the Covid 19 pandemic. The group draw took place on 15 December 2021.

Table

Fixtures

National Football League Division 2

Down will compete in Division Two of the National League in 2022. The GAA released the fixtures for the league season on 21 December 2021.

Fixtures

Table

Reports

Ulster Senior Football Championship

The draw for the 2022 Ulster Championship was made on 28 November 2021.

Fixtures

Bracket

Tailteann Cup

Down's entry into the 2022 All-Ireland Senior Football Championship was dependent on their performance in the National League campaign. Because Down got relegated they did not qualify for the All-Ireland Senior Football Championship and instead will play in the inaugural Tailteann Cup. The draw for the first round was made on 15 May 2022 with Down being drawn against Cavan.

Fixtures

Bracket

References

Down
Gaelic
Down county football team seasons